Matema is a town in southwestern Tanzania. The town is primarily a fishing village with some agriculture. It is located on the northern tip of Lake Nyasa and is 90 kilometres (straight-line distance) south-east of Mbeya.In 2016 the Tanzania National Bureau of Statistics report there were 10,304 people in the ward, from 17,103 in 2012.

Villages / vitongoji 
The ward has 3 villages and 12 vitongoji.

 Ikombe
 Busisya
 Ikunda
 Isimba
 Lyulilo
 Njisi
 Kisyosyo
 Busona
 Kisyosyo
 Lusonjo
 Matema
 Bulinda
 Ibungu
 Itukisyo
 Matema

References 

Populated places in Mbeya Region